(May 15 - ) is a Japanese voice actress represented by Arts Vision. She is a graduate of the Japan Narration Performance Institute.

Filmography

Television animation
2011
Tamayura ~hitotose~ (Aunt #B)
2012
Battle Spirits: Sword Eyes (Takato)
Detective Conan (Female announcer)

Dubbing

Live-action
The Accountant (Rita Blackburn (Jean Smart))
All Eyez on Me (Afeni Shakur (Danai Gurira))
All My Life (Megan Denhoff (Marielle Scott))
Black Lightning (Jennifer Pierce (China Anne McClain))
Carnage
Clerks (Caitlin Bree (Lisa Spoonauer))
Drop Dead Diva
Edge of Winter (Karen (Rachelle Lefevre))
Fantastic Four (Mrs. Grimm (Mary-Pat Green))
Gimme Shelter (June Bailey (Rosario Dawson))
Gone (Sharon Ames (Jennifer Carpenter))
Gunman in Joseon (Choi Hye-won (Jeon Hye-bin))
Jay and Silent Bob Strike Back (Netflix edition) (Sissy (Eliza Dushku))
The Letters (Shubashini Das (Priya Darshini))
Medium
Mortdecai (Detective (Jenna Russell))
Numb3rs
One Day
Orange Is the New Black (Tasha "Taystee" Jefferson (Danielle Brooks))
Pandemic (Denise (Missi Pyle))
The Perfect Host
Supernatural
Taj Mahal (Giovanna (Alba Rohrwacher))

Animation
The Angry Birds Movie (Betty Bird)
My Little Pony: Equestria Girls (Cup Cake)
My Little Pony: Equestria Girls – Rainbow Rocks (Octavia Melody)
My Little Pony: Friendship is Magic (Granny Smith, Cup Cake, Silver Spoon, Shadowbolt Leader ("Friendship is Magic"), Lily Valley ("Bridle Gossip"), Flitter ("Hurricane Fluttershy"))

References

External links
Arts Vision profile
Twitter account

Japanese voice actresses
Living people
Voice actresses from Osaka Prefecture
Year of birth missing (living people)
21st-century Japanese actresses
Arts Vision voice actors